Switzerland competed at the 1976 Winter Olympics in Innsbruck, Austria.

Medalists

Alpine skiing

Men

Women

Biathlon

Men

 1 One minute added per close miss (a hit in the outer ring), two minutes added per complete miss.

Bobsleigh

Cross-country skiing

Men

Men's 4 × 10 km relay

Figure skating

Women

Pairs

Ice hockey

First round
Winners (in bold) entered the Medal Round. Other teams played a consolation round for 7th-12th places.

|}

Consolation Round

Yugoslavia 6-4 Switzerland
Switzerland 8-3 Bulgaria
Japan 6-4 Switzerland
Austria 3-5 Switzerland
Romania 4-3 Switzerland

Nordic combined 

Events:
 normal hill ski jumping 
 15 km cross-country skiing

Ski jumping

Speed skating

Men

References
Official Olympic Reports
International Olympic Committee results database
 Olympic Winter Games 1976, full results by sports-reference.com

Nations at the 1976 Winter Olympics
1976 Winter Olympics
1976 in Swiss sport